The Madagascar Armed Forces is the national military of Madagascar. The IISS detailed the armed forces in 2012 as including an Army of 12,500+, a Navy of 500, and a 500-strong Air Force.

The armed forces were involved in the 2009 Malagasy political crisis. During World War II, Malagasy troops fought in France, Morocco, and Syria.

History

The rise of centralized kingdoms among the Sakalava, Merina and other ethnic groups produced the island's first standing armies, first equipped with spears, but later with muskets, cannons and other firearms. King Ralambo (1575–1612) raised the first standing army in the highland Kingdom of Imerina with a handful of guns, although for at least two centuries the armies of the Sakalava were much larger and better equipped, possessing thousands of muskets obtained principally through trade with European partners. By the early 19th century, however, the army of the Kingdom of Imerina was able to bring much of the island under Merina control.

Merina Queen Ranavalona, like her predecessors, utilized the tradition of fanampoana (service due to the sovereign in lieu of taxes) to conscript a large portion of the population of Imerina into military service, enabling the queen to raise a standing army that was estimated at 20,000 to 30,000 soldiers.
By the late 19th century French plans to colonize Madagascar were gaining momentum, leading British mercenaries to provide training to the queen's army in an unsuccessful bid to repel the French troops. Madagascar was colonized in 1896, and during World War II over 46,000 Malagasy soldiers were drafted to fight with the Allies, over 2,000 of whom died fighting for France.

Madagascar gained political independence and sovereignty over its military in 1960. Since this time Madagascar has never engaged in an armed conflict, whether against another state or within its own borders. As such the armed forces of Madagascar have primarily served a peacekeeping role. However, the military has occasionally intervened to restore order during periods of political unrest. When President Philibert Tsiranana was forced to step down in 1972, a military directorate ensured an interim government before appointing one of its own, Admiral Didier Ratsiraka, to lead the country into its socialist Second Republic. He launched a strategy of obligatory national armed or civil service for all young citizens regardless of gender. The majority were channeled into civil service, including agriculture and education programs for rural development based on the socialist Soviet model. Ratsiraka would also mobilize elements of the military to pacify unarmed protesters, occasionally using violent means. His order to fire upon unarmed protesters in 1989 was the catalyst for transition to the democratic Third Republic in 1992. The military remained largely neutral during the protracted standoff between incumbent Ratsiraka and challenger Marc Ravalomanana in the disputed 2001 presidential elections. By contrast, in 2009 a segment of the army defected to the side of Andry Rajoelina, then-mayor of Antananarivo, in support of his attempt to force President Ravalomanana from power. It is widely believed that payoffs were involved in persuading these military personnel to change camps in support of the coup d'état.

As of 2010, the military of Madagascar is composed of the 8,100 paramilitary of the National Gendarmerie and the 13,500 members of the Armed Forces. According to the International Institute of Strategic Studies' Military Balance 2010, the latter includes an Army of 12,500, a Navy of 500 and a 500-strong Air Force, while the CIA Factbook describes the Armed Forces as consisting of the Intervention Force, Aeronaval Force (navy and air) and the Development Force. Military service is voluntary and limited to males aged 18 to 25; every citizen of either gender is required to have perform either military or civil service for a minimum of 18 months. However, because of a lack of up-to-date census data, this requirement is not currently enforced. The Gendarmerie recruits Malagasy citizens between the ages of 20 and 30 (or 35 if the recruit has prior military service). Military expenses constituted just over one percent of GDP. Under Ravalomanana, military expenditure doubled from 54 million USD in 2006 to 103 million USD in 2008.

Equipment

Small Arms

Armoured fighting vehicles

Artillery

Naval 

1 Chamois class patrol boat 
1 d'Entrecasteaux-Class patrol boat
1 Arras-Class aviso
6 La-Confiance patrol craft
1 LCT (Mark-8 Class)
2 Coastal patrol vessel of 26m: Tselatra and Malaky

Aircraft 

Madagascar has a small air force (Armée de l'Air Malgache). A number of MiG-21s, MI-8, C-47 Dakota and An-26 were scrapped around 2012.

References

Bibliography
 
 

 World Aircraft Information Files. Brightstar Publishing, London. File 339 Sheet 01

External links
 Ministry of Madagascar National Defense